The 1927–28 Prima Divisione was the 2nd edition of a second tier tournament of the Italian Football Championship which was organized at national level.

Team selection 
 
The format of the championship was confirmed, but AS Roma and SSC Napoli received a wild card to join the National Division as guests, so the Southern group remained solely with eight clubs.

Following merging of new clubs in Rome and Genoa, both Udinese and Anconitana were re-elected in the league. 

AC Monza, Ponziana, Carrarese and Ternana were promoted from the inter-regional leagues.

Following various clubs merging and financial bankruptcies for a till weak Southern football, Valenzana and Lecco Calcio from the North, and Tivoli and US Savoia from the South were invited to join the league.

Rules 
The promotion of the group winners was confirmed.

Relegation zone was theoretically expanded to two clubs for each group, but the Great Reform of the Italian football of 1928–29 changed the situation.

Group A 

 Atalanta promoted to Divisione Nazionale 1928-29.
 Venezia, Fiumana and Triestina later invited to Divisione Nazionale by the  FIGC as guests.
 Ancona and Monfalconese later re-elected following the Great Reform of the Italian football.

Group B 

 Biellese promoted to Divisione Nazionale 1928-29.
 Legnano later invited to Divisione Nazionale by the FIGC as guests.
 U.S. Milanese merged by the fascist FIGC into Inter to create new Società Sportiva Ambrosiana.
 Derthona and Astigiani later re-elected following the Great Reform of the Italian football.

Group C 

 Pistoiese promoted to Divisione Nazionale 1928-29.
 Prato later invited to Divisione Nazionale by the FIGC as guests.
 Lecco and Lucchese later re-elected following the Great Reform of the Italian football.

Group D 

 Bari promoted to Divisione Nazionale 1928-29.
 Fiorentina later invited to Divisione Nazionale by the FIGC as guests.
 Ternana, Foggia, Taranto and Tivoli forcely resigned from the Direttorio Divisioni Superiori for a general financial crash, and joined a special Southern Championship.
 Savoia went bankrupt during the championship and was disbanded.
 Ideale Bari merged with Bari Liberty to create AS Bari.

Title final group 

Tie–breakers:

Final:

 Atalanta B-champions 1928.

Championship reform 
Under orders of fascist Leandro Arpinati, the FIGC President, the Italian football had its greatest reform between 1928 and 1929.

A completely new round robin Serie B was planned for 1929. Arpinati immediately expanded the National Division, which would split in A and B in 1929, with best First Division clubs.

References

Sources 
 Gazzetta dello Sport, season 1927-28

Serie B seasons
2
Italy